Desiree Petersen is a professional wrestler. She was born in Copenhagen, Denmark and once held the WWF Women's Tag Team Championship.

Wrestling career 
In 1982, Desiree Petersen met Stu Hart. Hart would not train her, but referred her for training with The Fabulous Moolah. After training at Moolah's school, Petersen made her professional debut in January 1983 against Velvet McIntyre in British Columbia.

World Wrestling Federation (1984–1985; 1988) 
In December 1984, Petersen replaced Princess Victoria as Velvet McIntyre's tag-team partner and was awarded the WWF Women's Tag Team Championship. From 1984-1985, Petersen competed in solo and tag-team matches against Moolah, Mad Maxine, Leilani Kai, Judy Martin, Donna Christanello, Penny Mitchell, Peggy Patterson, and Peggy Lee. During the first half of 1985, Petersen was engaged in a major solo feud against Martin, which was also spotlighted during her interview with Vince McMahon on Tuesday Night Titans in June 1985.

Petersen and McIntyre defended the titles until splitting up. A tag team title match between The Glamour Girls (Leilani Kai and Judy Martin) and champions McIntyre and Petersen was reported to have happened in Egypt in 1985, but in actuality, the match never took place. Kai and Martin were awarded the titles after McIntyre and Petersen split up when Petersen left the WWF in 1985.

Petersen returned to the WWF in 1988 and feuded with WWF Women's Champion Sherri Martel.

Ladies Professional Wrestling Association 
After leaving the WWF, Petersen competed in the Ladies Professional Wrestling Association. At the LPWA Super Ladies Showdown pay-per-view event, she was defeated by Shinobu Kandori.

Championships and accomplishments 
 World Wrestling Federation
 WWF Women's Tag Team Champion (1 time) - with Velvet McIntyre

References

External links 
 Desiree Petersen Profile

Living people
Sportspeople from Copenhagen
Danish female professional wrestlers
Year of birth missing (living people)
Stampede Wrestling alumni
20th-century professional wrestlers